Real Talk is the third studio album by American rapper Fabolous. It was released on November 9, 2004 by Desert Storm Records and Atlantic Records.

Background
The production on the album was handled by DJ Khaled, The Neptunes, Trackmasters, J. R. Rotem, Just Blaze and Scott Storch, among others.

Legacy
Real Talk was supported two singles: "Breathe" which is produced by Just Blaze and "Baby" which is produced by Flame Throwers and contains guest vocals from Mike Shorey. Videos were created for the singles "Do the Damn Thing" featuring Young Jeezy, which received minor airplay on BET, and "Tit 4 Tat" featuring Pharrell, which includes a portion of the album track "Round and Round. The album was received lukewarm from a critical standpoint but was a commercial success. The album debuted at number six on the US Billboard 200, selling 179,000 copies in its first week and has been certified gold by the Recording Industry Association of America (RIAA).

Critical reception

Steve 'Flash' Juon of RapReviews gave note of the album's lengthy runtime being a challenge for listeners but commended Fabolous for striking a balance between "materialism and spiritualism" throughout the track listing with help from his producers utilizing his "smooth monotone flow" in the right places, concluding that, "I'm not yet prepared to say Fabolous is DA TRUTH or that his rhyme writing has put him into echelons anywhere near the all-time greats, but he's come a long way since his Ghetto Fabolous days. You may find Real Talk a refreshing change of pace too." K.B. Tindal of HipHopDX praised Fabolous for remaining consistent in delivering club bangers ("Tit 4 Tat"), romantic slow jams ("Baby") and street cuts ("Don't Stop Won't Stop"), saying "There are always the pure exotic street flow wit hard punch lines to the gut that Fab delivers as well as the smoothly shaped ballads that he always dishes out the chicks. On Real Talk, Fab delivers as usual." Steve Jones of USA Today praised Fabolous' lyricism having more direct sharpness and maturity to elevate the record's "brash confidence" alongside the usual hip-hop tropes, concluding that, "In the past, his hits have tended to lean toward female fans. But with Real Talk, he balances matters." Kris Ex, writing for Blender, was critical of Fabolous' lack of distinct character but praised him for being an entertaining wordsmith with a breezy yet confident flow, concluding that "It's this tension that keeps Real Talk from being a collection of one-serving throwaways: Fabolous lands dazzling lyrical stunts while sounding like he's coasting along on cruise control." AllMusic's Andy Kellman gave praise to "Breathe" for showing "signs of being a hip-hop classic" but was critical of Fabolous stretching his rapping skills by unconvincingly taking on various styles and a "mixed bag of satisfactory-to-strong crossovers", concluding that, "[T]here's enough quality material to help fill out a Fabolous best-of, but the touch-all-bases formula inhibits the album's potential of being any better than Ghetto Fabolous or Street Dreams."

Commercial performance
Real Talk debuted at number six on the US Billboard 200 with 179,000 copies sold in its first week. This became Fabolous' third US top-ten debut. On December 13, 2004, the album was certified gold by the Recording Industry Association of America (RIAA) for sales of over 500,000 copies. As of February 2007, the album sold over 550,000 copies in the United States, according to Nielsen Soundscan.

Track listing

Charts

Weekly charts

Year-end charts

Certifications

References

2004 albums
Fabolous albums
Albums produced by DJ Khaled
Albums produced by J. R. Rotem
Albums produced by Just Blaze
Albums produced by Scott Storch
Albums produced by the Neptunes
Atlantic Records albums